David Oppenheim (1664 – 12 September 1736) was the chief rabbi of Nikolsburg in 1689 and later of Prague. His book collection constitutes an important part of the Hebrew section of the Bodleian Library in Oxford.

Personal background 
Oppenheim was born in 1664 in Worms, where his father, Abraham, was a communal leader. David Oppenheim's teachers included Gershon Ashkenazi and Ya'akov Sack (father of Tzvi Ashkenazi, the Chacham Tzvi). In 1681, he married Gnendl, daughter of the "court Jew" Leffmann Behrends (Lipmann Cohen) of Hanover. 

His extraordinary collection of manuscripts and prints was bought by the Bodleian Library in Oxford in 1829 for 9,000 thalers.

References

Bibliography 
Alexander Marx, “The History of David Oppenheimer's Library”, in Id., Studies in Jewish History and Booklore, The Jewish Theological Seminary of America, New York 1944, pp. 238–255.

Teplitsky, Joshua, Prince of the Press. How One Collector Built History’s Most Enduring and Remarkable Jewish Library, Yale University Press, New Haven & London 2019.

External links

1664 births
1736 deaths
Rabbis from Worms, Germany
Chief rabbis of cities
Czech rabbis

Rabbis of Prague